Lucio Manzin (21 August 1913 – 7 August 1988) was an Italian equestrian. He competed in two events at the 1952 Summer Olympics.

References

External links
 

1913 births
1988 deaths
Italian male equestrians
Olympic equestrians of Italy
Equestrians at the 1952 Summer Olympics
People from Gradisca d'Isonzo
Sportspeople from Friuli-Venezia Giulia